Varen may refer to:

 Varen, Switzerland, a municipality in the canton of Valais, Switzerland
 Varen, Tarn-et-Garonne, a commune in the Tarn-et-Garonne department, France
 Bernhard Varen
 Daniel Steen Varen